"She Only Loves Me When I'm There" is a song by Australian indie rock band Ball Park Music, released on 14 February 2014 as the lead single from their third studio album Puddinghead. The song debuted and peaked at number 70, becoming the band's first song to chart on the ARIA top 100. The song was certified platinum in Australia in 2021.

Charts

Certifications

References

2014 singles
2013 songs
Ball Park Music songs